Mirsad Ramić (born 6 December 1992) is a Bosnian professional footballer who plays as a centre-forward for Bosnian Premier League club Igman Konjic.

Club career
Ramić had success with Željezničar, winning the Premier League and the cup in the 2011–12 season. In the 2016–17 First League of FBiH season, Ramić won the league with GOŠK Gabela and got promoted to the Bosnian Premier League. In May 2019, he left GOŠK after the club got relegated back to the First League of FBiH.

On 31 May 2019, a few days after leaving GOŠK, Ramić signed a three year contract with Tuzla City.

Honours
Željezničar
Bosnian Premier League: 2011–12
Bosnian Cup: 2011–12

GOŠK Gabela
First League of FBiH: 2016–17

References

External links
Mirsad Ramić at Sofascore

1992 births
Living people
People from Jablanica, Bosnia and Herzegovina
Association football forwards
Bosnia and Herzegovina footballers
FK Željezničar Sarajevo players
NK Zvijezda Gradačac players
NK Travnik players
FK Goražde players
NK GOŠK Gabela players
FK Tuzla City players
FK Sloboda Tuzla players
FK Igman Konjic players
Premier League of Bosnia and Herzegovina players
First League of the Federation of Bosnia and Herzegovina players